Kalasapadu is a village in YSR Kadapa district of the Indian state of Andhra Pradesh. It is located in Kalasapadu mandal of Badvel revenue division.

Geography
It has an average elevation of 191 meters (629 feet).

References 

Villages in Kadapa district